Thorndale High School is a public high school located in the city of Thorndale, Texas, USA and classified as a 2A school by the UIL.  It is a part of the Thorndale Independent School District located in southwestern Milam County.   In 2015, the school was rated "Met Standard" by the Texas Education Agency.

Athletics
The Thorndale Bulldogs compete in these sports - 

Volleyball, Cross Country, Football, Basketball, Golf, Tennis, Track, Baseball & Softball

State titles
Baseball - 
1996(1A), 2005(1A)
Boys Basketball - 
2007(1A/D1), 2008(1A/D1)
Football 
1989(1A), 1994(1A), 1995(1A)
Men's Track
2003(1A) Gold Medalists 800M Relay
Volleyball
2018(2A) Bronze Medalists
Softball
2019(2A) Silver Medalists
Cross Country
2019(2A)appearance, 2017(2A)appearances
Golf
2019(2A)appearance

Fine Arts
One Act Play 
1990(1A)
Marching Band
2018 UIL 2A SMBC Bronze Medalists
2020 UIL 2A SMBC Champions

Notable alumni
Lee Roy Caffey (Class of 1959) was an American football linebacker in the National Football League from 1963-1972 and played on 3 Super Bowl championship teams.

References

External links
Thorndale ISD website

Public high schools in Texas
Schools in Milam County, Texas